Tettigadini is a tribe of cicadas in the family Cicadidae. There are about 11 genera and at least 50 described species in Tettigadini, found in the Neotropics.

Genera
These 11 genera belong to the tribe Tettigadini:
 Acuticephala Torres, 1958
 Alarcta Torres, 1958
 Babras Jacobi, 1907
 Calliopsida Torres, 1958
 Chonosia Distant, 1905
 Coata Distant, 1906
 Mendozana Distant, 1906
 Psephenotettix Torres, 1958
 Tettigades Amyot & Audinet-Serville, 1843
 Tettigotoma Torres, 1942
 Torrescada Sanborn & Heath, 2017

References

Further reading

External links

 

Tibicininae
Hemiptera tribes